The Courtyard Crisis was a constitutional conflict between the Swedish king and prime minister and significant event in Swedish 20th-century history, marking the last time the Monarch of Sweden directly intervened in a controversial partisan political issue, as was done by the King Gustaf V through the Courtyard Speech at the Royal Palace in Stockholm on 6 February 1914, in front of 32 000 assembled farmers from all over the country, in which he argued for higher military spending.

In early 1914, tensions ran high in Sweden over the issue of defence spending, with World War I looming over Europe. On 6 February 1914, Conservative opponents of the Liberal government of Prime Minister Karl Staaff summoned a 32 000-person demonstration of farmers demanding higher defence spending. Gustaf V, who was in continual conflict with his government, declared to the crowd gathered in the courtyard of Stockholm Palace that he shared their concerns.

When Prime Minister Staaff reminded the King that a parliamentary system meant the latter's exclusion from partisan politics, the King refused and said he would "not give up the right to communicate freely with the Swedish people". The government promptly resigned, and 136 Liberal members from both chambers of the Riksdag issued a statement saying the form of government was in jeopardy, and urging the Swedish people to defend its right to rule itself. Their opponents, the Conservatives and the Farmers' League, in turn accused them of putting parliamentarism over national security, and called on the people to put every effort into solving the defence issue.

The King appointed a conservative government of high-ranking civil servants and businessmen led by Hjalmar Hammarskjöld, but tensions continued in the debate on spending. The second chamber of the Riksdag was dissolved and new elections called for.

The conflict abruptly ended that June with the imminent breakout of war in Europe, which in effect decided the argument in favour of the Conservatives; however, some reforms and budget amendments were implemented to appease the Liberals. In the end, only the Social Democrats voted against the defence programme, although 24 Liberal parliamentarians discarded their votes in protest.

References

1914 in Sweden
Government crises
Constitutional crises
1910s in Stockholm